Hi Kyung Kim (born 1954) is a South Korean composer.

Life
Hi Kyung Kim was born in South Korea. She graduated from Seoul National University with a BA and the University of California, Berkeley, with an MA and PhD, where she studied composition with Andrew Imbrie, Olly Wilson, Gérard Grisey, and Sung-Jae Lee. As a benefit of the U.C. Berkeley’s George C. Ladd Prix de Paris, she worked at Institut de Rechéreche et Coordination Acoustique/Musique (IRCAM) and École Normale Supérieure in Paris from 1988-1990.

After completing her studies, Kim took a position as assistant professor at the University of California, Santa Cruz. She returned to Korea in 1985 and 1998 for research and study of Korean music, and also researched the music of Elliott Carter at the Paul Sacher Foundation in Basel, Switzerland.

Honors and awards
Eisner prize in Creative Arts and
Two Di Lorenzo Composition Prizes
U.C. Berkeley’s George C. Ladd Prix de Paris
Walter Hinrichsen Award from the American Academy and Institute of Arts and Letters

Works
Selected works include:

Thousand Gates (2010/2011) Korean and Western choreography, Korean ensemble (percussion, haegeum), Western ensemble (violin, cello, clarinet/bass clarinet, percussion) and multi-media
Rituel III (2004/5) Korean choreography/percussion, Korean ensemble (janggo, daegeum) and Western ensemble (violin, cello, clarinet/bass clarinet, percussion), multi-media
Rituel II (2002) Korean choreography/Korean percussion, Korean ensemble (chanting, piri/bamboo oboe, saengwhang/mouth organ, hun/clay flute, yangkeum/dulcimer); Western ensemble (violin, cello, clarinet/bass clarinet, percussion)
Rituel (2001) Korean dance/percussion and violin, cello, clarinet,  percussion
When He was Six Hundred Years Old (2010) haegeum (Korean fiddle), clarinet, cello
Isle of Eeo (2010) violin (2), viola, cello, percussion
Clarinet Quintet (2009), clarinet, string quartet, editing of unfinished work of Andrew Imbrie
At the Edge of the Ocean (2001/2003) flute, clarinet, violin, viola, cello, percussion
Trio “Sori” (2002), Korean daegeum (bamboo flute), clarinet and cello
Primitive Dance (1990/1999) string quartet
Breaking the Silence (1996) violin, cello, piano
Unknown Lives (1995) flute, clarinet, violin, viola, cello, percussion, piano
When You Rush (1991) flute, clarinet, bassoon, trombone, violin, cello, harp
What are Years? (1988/1991) 2 movements, soprano, flute, clarinet, guitar, violin, double bass
Short Dance (1987) string quartet
Encounter (1986) clarinet, bass clarinet, bassoon, cello and five percussion players
Ari for soprano & string quartet (1983)
Satisfaction (1977) chamber ensemble
Musical Gathering (1976) flute, oboe, clarinet, bassoon, horn
Crash (1975) string quartet
Resistance (1975) soprano, piano
FOR RAE: “I am too excited to tell you” piano solo
The Poet KIM SAT GAT: daegeum solo (bamboo flute) (2007/2010)
Secret Wine: percussion solo (2008)
Two Years with the Seine (2007) 4 movements, clarinet and cello
A Story: gayageum solo (2006) 3 movements
Orange Pastel (2001/2009) two percussionists
Crystal Drops (2000/2003) 2 movements, two pianos
After the Fall (1998) clarinet and bass clarinet
Instant Breath: flute solo (1999)
Reflection: clarinet solo (1985)
Intrigues (1985) 3 movements, prepared piano and clarinet
Dialogue (1974) violin, piano
Path way: piano solo (1974)
Requiem chamber orchestra & chamber choir
Islands in the Bay, percussion concerto (1993), 3 movements
Conversation for Orchestra (1976)
Looking at the New Heaven and Earth (1976) mixed voice SATB and piano
Step (1988) for computer/tape

Her music has been recorded and issued on CD, including:
Crystal Drops: Music By Hi Kyung Kim (2008)
Tribute To Andrew Imbrie In Celebration Of His Eightieth Birthday (2005)
Solos And Duos: Music By Andrew Imbrie And Hi Kyung Kim (2008)
Tribute To Chou Wen-Chung (2009)
Kim: Unknown Lives (2000)

References

1954 births
Living people
20th-century classical composers
South Korean music educators
Women classical composers
South Korean classical composers
South Korean expatriates in France
South Korean expatriates in Switzerland
South Korean expatriates in the United States
University of California, Berkeley alumni
Seoul National University alumni
Women music educators
20th-century women composers